The 2010 Wheelchair Basketball World Championship was held in Birmingham, Great Britain from 7 to 17 July 2010. Both the men's and women's tournaments were held. The Championships was a qualifying event for the London 2012 Paralympic Games.

Medalists

Squads

Each of the 12 men's and 10 women's teams selected a squad of 12 players for the tournament.

Athletes are given an eight-level-score specific to wheelchair basketball, ranging from 0.5 to 4.5. Lower scores represent a higher degree of disability. The sum score of all players on the court cannot exceed 14.

Men

Preliminary round
All times local (UTC)

Group A

Group B

Knockout stage

9th–12th playoffs

9th–12th semifinals

11th place playoff

9th place playoff

5th–8th playoffs

5th–8th semifinals

7th place playoff

5th place playoff

Quarterfinals

Semifinals

Bronze medal game

Final

Final standings

Women

Preliminary round
All times local (UTC)

Group A

Group B

Knockout stage

9th place playoff

5th–8th playoffs

5th–8th semifinals

7th place playoff

5th place playoff

Quarterfinals

Semifinals

Bronze medal game

Final

Final standings

See also
2010 FIBA World Championship
2010 FIBA World Championship for Women

References

Official site of the 2010 Wheelchair Basketball World Championship, Great Britain Wheelchair Basketball Association (GBWBA)

External links
Official site

 
Wheelchair Basketball World Championship
2010 in wheelchair basketball
2010–11 in British basketball
International basketball competitions hosted by the United Kingdom
2010 in English sport
International sports competitions in Birmingham, West Midlands
2010s in Birmingham, West Midlands